USS Block Island (CVE-106) (then LPH-1 and CVE-106 again) was a  of the United States Navy. She was the second ship to carry her name, done in honor of the first one, being launched 12 days after the original was sunk.

She was launched on 10 June 1944 as Sunset Bay by Todd-Pacific Shipyards, Inc. Tacoma, Washington; sponsored by Mrs. E. J. (Grace) Hallenbeck (mother of Major Pappy Boyington, then a Prisoner of War of the Japanese), and commissioned as Block Island on 30 December 1944.

Service history

World War II
Block Island got underway for Pearl Harbor on 20 March 1945. Upon arrival she underwent a period of provisioning and training in preparation for the invasion of Okinawa. On 17 April, Block Island left Hawaii and steamed toward Okinawa, via Ulithi. Flight operations commenced immediately upon her arrival 3 May and lasted until 16 June when she departed for Leyte. After a brief stay at San Pedro Bay, the carrier steamed through the Straits of Makassar for Borneo. From 26 June-6 July, she took part in the Balikpapan operation. She then proceeded to Guam where she was anchored at the time of the cessation of hostilities.

Post-War
From 6–9 September, Block Island took part in the evacuation of Allied prisoners of war from Formosa. She continued cruising in the Far East until 14 October, and arrived at San Diego on 11 December 1945. Leaving San Diego on 6 January 1946, she transited the Panama Canal and reached Norfolk on the 20th. She was placed in service in reserve on 28 May 1946.

On 29 May 1946, Block Island was towed from Norfolk to Annapolis, reporting to the Superintendent of the Naval Academy to serve as a training ship for midshipmen. This duty was terminated on 3 October 1950, and Block Island was transferred to the Atlantic Reserve Fleet.

The vessel was recommissioned on 28 April 1951 and reported to the Atlantic Fleet. From June 1951-November 1953, she carried out local operations off the Virginia Capes, made four cruises to the Caribbean and one to the United Kingdom, France, and Italy from 17 April – 26 June 1953. The painter Thomas Hart Benton was a guest on the return trip from Europe.

On 15 January 1954, she was placed in commission in reserve at Philadelphia and out of commission in reserve on 27 August 1954. In 1957–1958, she was redesignated LPH-1 in anticipation of conversion under project SCB 159 to an amphibious assault ship, but the conversion was canceled and her designation reverted to CVE-106 before any work was done. Block Island was stricken from the Naval Vessel Register on 1 July 1959.

References

External links

Commencement Bay-class escort carriers
World War II escort aircraft carriers of the United States
Ships built in Tacoma, Washington
1944 ships
Cold War escort carriers of the United States